Arthur is a male given name of Brythonic origin. Its popularity derives from it being the name of the legendary hero King Arthur. The etymology is disputed. It may derive from the Celtic Artos meaning “Bear”. Another theory is that the name is derived from the Roman clan Artorius who lived in Roman Britain for centuries.

A common spelling variant used in many Slavic, Romance, and Germanic languages is Artur. In Spanish and Italian it is Arturo.

Etymology
The earliest datable attestation of the name Arthur is in the early 9th century Welsh-Latin text Historia Brittonum, where it refers to a circa 5th to 6th-century Briton general who fought against the invading Saxons, and who later gave rise to the famous King Arthur of medieval legend and literature. A possible earlier mention of the same man is to be found in the epic Welsh poem Y Gododdin by Aneirin, which some scholars assign to the late 6th century, though this is still a matter of debate and the poem only survives in a late 13th century manuscript entitled the Book of Aneirin. A 9th-century Breton landowner named Arthur witnessed several charters collected in the Cartulary of Redon.

The Irish borrowed the name by the late 6th century (either from an early Archaic Welsh or Cumbric form Artur), producing Old Irish Artúr (Latinized as Arturius by Adomnán in his Life of St. Columba, written circa 697–700), The earliest historically attested bearer of the name is a son or grandson of Áedán mac Gabráin (died 609).

The exact origins of the name Arthur remains a matter of debate. The most widely accepted etymology derives it from the Roman nomen gentile (family name) Artorius. Artorius is of obscure and contested etymology, but is possibly of Messapic or Etruscan origin. According to the linguist and Celticist Stefan Zimmer, it is possible that Artorius has a Celtic origin, being a Latinization of the hypothetical name *Artorījos, derived from the patronym *Arto-rīg-ios, meaning "Son of the Bear/Warrior-King". *Arto-rīg-ios is unattested, but the root, *arto-rīg, "bear/warrior-king", is the source of the Old Irish personal name Artrí, while the similar *Arto-maglos, "bear-prince", produced names in several Brittonic languages. According to Zimmer's etymology, the Celtic short compositional vowel -o- was lengthened and the long -ī- in the second element of the compound -rījos was shortened by Latin speakers, under the influence of Latin agent nouns ending in -tōr (and their derivatives in -tōrius). Some scholars have noted that the legendary King Arthur's name only appears as Arthur, Arthurus, or Arturus in early Latin Arthurian texts, never as Artōrius (although the Classical Latin Artōrius became Arturius in some Vulgar Latin dialects). However, this may not say anything about the origin of the name Arthur, as Artōrius would regularly become Art(h)ur when borrowed into Welsh.

The commonly proposed derivation from Welsh arth "bear" + (g)wr "man" (earlier *Arto-uiros in Brittonic) is not possible for phonological and orthographic reasons; notably that a Brittonic compound name *Arto-uiros should produce Old Welsh *Artgur (where -u- represents the short vowel /u/) and Middle/Modern Welsh *Arthwr and not Arthur (where -u- is a long vowel /ʉː/) In Welsh poetry the name is always spelled Arthur and is exclusively rhymed with words ending in -ur—never words ending in -wr—which confirms that the second element cannot be [g]wr "man").

An alternative theory, which has only gained limited acceptance among scholars, derives the name Arthur from the Latin Arcturus (the brightest star in the constellation Boötes, near Ursa Major or the Great Bear), which is the latinisation of the Greek Ἀρκτοῦρος (Arktouros) and means Bear Guardian from ἄρκτος (arktos "bear") and οὖρος (ouros "watcher/guardian"). This form, Arcturus would have become Art(h)ur when borrowed into Welsh, and its brightness and position in the sky led people to regard it as the "guardian of the bear" and the "leader" of the other stars in Boötes.

Avestan /arta and its Vedic equivalent  both derive from Proto-Indo-Iranian *ṛtá- "truth", which in turn continues Proto-Indo-European * "properly joined, right, true", from the root *.

People and characters with the given name Arthur

Kings and princes

Legendary 
 King Arthur, king of Britain in Arthurian legend

Brittany 
Arthur I, Duke of Brittany (1187–1203), killed by his uncle king John Lackland
Arthur II, Duke of Brittany (1261–1312)
Arthur III, Duke of Brittany (1393–1458)

Great Britain 
Arthur, Prince of Wales (1486–1502), elder son of Henry VII of England
Prince Arthur, Duke of Connaught and Strathearn (1850–1942), seventh child and third son of Queen Victoria
Prince Arthur of Connaught (1883–1938), son of Prince Arthur, Duke of Connaught and Strathearn

Famous people
Arthur or Arthur Melo (born 1996), Brazilian footballer
Arthur "Man" Agee Jr., American former Chicago-area high school basketball player
Arthur Ahmed (born 1970), Ghanaian politician
Arthur Albiston (born 1957), Scottish footballer who played for Manchester United and Scotland
Arthur Alexander (1940–1993), American soul singer and songwriter
Arthur Antunes Coimbra (born 1953), Brazilian footballer, commonly known as Zico
Arthur Ashe (1943–1993), American tennis player
Arthur Askey (1900–1982), English comedian
Artur Awejde (1838–1863), Polish commissioner of Augustów Voivodeship during the January Uprising
Arthur Balfour (1848–1930), earl of Balfour, British politician, and prime minister under Edward VII
Art Baltazar (born 1968), comic writer and illustrator for DC Super Pets
Arthur Harold Beal (1896–1992), creator of Nitt Witt Ridge
Arthur Blok (1882–1974), English first administrative head of the Technion – Israel Institute of Technology
Arthur Bluethenthal (1891–1918), American football player
Arthur Bradfield (1892–1978), English cricketer
Arthur Bramley (1929–2021), English footballer
Arthur Bremer (born 1950), American attempted assassin of George Wallace
Art Carney (1918–2003), American actor
Arthur Cayley (1822–1895), British mathematician
Sir Arthur C. Clarke (1917–2008), British writer
Sir Arthur Conan Doyle (1859–1930), British writer
Arthur Conley (1946–2003), American soul singer
General Sir Arthur Currie (1875-1933), senior officer of the Canadian Army during the First World War
Arthur Darvill (born 1982), British actor and musician 
Arthur Marcelles de Silva (1879-1957), Sri Lankan Sinhala surgeon, first Sri Lankan to gain Fellowship in the Royal College of Surgeons of England
Arthur Delaporte (born 1991), French politician
Sir Arthur Eddington (1882–1944), British astrophysicist
Sir Arthur Evans (1851–1941), British archaeologist
Arthur Fenner (1745–1805), fourth Governor of Rhode Island
Arthur Frommer (born 1929), American travel writer and publisher
Arthur Burdett Frost (1851-1928), American illustrator, graphic artist, painter and comics writer
Arthur J. Gallagher, founder of Arthur J. Gallagher & Co.
Art Garfunkel (born 1941), American entertainer
Arthur Gatter (1940–1990), German serial killer
Count Arthur Gobineau (1816–1882), French polemicist and political and historical writer
Arthur Godfrey (1903–1983), American radio and television personality
Arthur Goldberg (1908–1990), American politician and judge
A. O. Granger (1846–1914), American industrialist and soldier
Arthur Greiser (1897–1946), German Nazi SS officer executed for war crimes
Arthur Guinness (1725–1803), Irish brewer 
Arthur Hailey (1920–2004), British novelist
Arthur Harvey (disambiguation)
Arthur Lawrence Hellyer Jr. (1923–2018), American radio host
Art Heyman (1941–2012), American NBA basketball player
Arthur Holden (born 1959), Canadian voice actor
Arthur Honegger (1892–1955), Swiss composer
Arthur James Johnes (1809–1871), English judge
Arthur J. Jones (born 1948), American neo-Nazi politician 
Arthur Koestler (1905–1983), British writer 
Arthur Laffer (born 1940), American economist 
Arthur Lee (1945–2006), American musician
Arthur Lethbridge (known as Ivor Moreton) (1908–1984), British singer and pianist
Arthur Liebehenschel (1901–1948), German commandant at the Auschwitz and Majdanek concentration camps executed for war crimes
Art Linkletter (1912–2010), Canadian-born American radio and television personality
Arthur Loveridge (1891–1980), British herpetologist 
Arthur Lydiard (1917–2004), New Zealand runner and athletics coach
Arthur MacArthur, Jr., (1845–1912), American soldier
Arthur "Harpo" Marx (1888–1964), American comedian and musician
Arthur Meighen (1874–1960), Canadian prime minister in the 1920s
Arthur Miley (born 1993), American football player
Arthur Miller (1915–2005), American playwright
Arthur O'Shaughnessy (1844–1881), British poet and herpetologist 
Arthur Uther Pendragon (born 1954), British neo-druid leader
Art Potter (1909–1998), Canadian ice hockey administrator
Arthur Prysock (1924–1997), American jazz and R&B singer
Sir Arthur Godwin Ranasinghe, Sri Lankan Sinhala civil servant, Governor of the Central Bank of Sri Lanka from 1954-1959
Arthur Rimbaud (1854–1891), French poet
Arthur Rödl (1898–1945), German Nazi SS commandant of the Gross-Rosen concentration camp
Art Rupe (1917–2022), American music executive and record pro
Arthur J. Samberg (1941–2020), American businessman
Arthur Scargill (born 1938), British miners' union leader
Arthur M. Schlesinger, Jr. (1917–2007), American historian
Arthur Moritz Schoenflies (1853–1928), German mathematician
Arthur Schopenhauer (1788–1860), German philosopher 
Arthur Seyss-Inquart (1892–1946), Austrian Nazi politician
Arthur "Buddy" Schumacher (1916–1925), boy who was found murdered in 1925
Art Shamsky (born 1941), American major league baseball player and Israel Baseball League manager
Arthur Shawcross (1945–2008), American cannibalistic serial killer and rapist
Sir Arthur Sullivan (1842–1900), English composer who did operatic collaborations with librettist W. S. Gilbert
Arthur Tracy (1899–1997), American singer and actor
Arthur Treacher (1894–1975), English actor
Arthur Vandenberg (1884–1951), American politician
Arthur Warbrick (1863–1902), New Zealand rugby footballer 
Sir Arthur Wellesley (1769–1852), duke of Wellington; military commander who defeated Napoleon at Waterloo; British Prime Minister 1828–1830 and briefly in 1834
Arthur Wijewardena (1887–1964), Chief Justice of Sri Lanka from 1949-1950
Arthur A. Wilson, Anglo-Indian cinematographer

Artturi
 Artturi Jämsén (1925–1976), Finnish politician
 Artturi Lehkonen (born 1995), Finnish professional ice hockey player 
 Artturi Leinonen (1888–1963), Finnish journalist and politician
 Artturi Ilmari Virtanen (1895–1973), Finnish chemist

Fictional characters 

Arthur, an animated educational television series for children ages 4 to 8, developed by Kathy Waugh for PBS, and produced by WGBH. 
Arthur Kirkland (アーサー・カークランド), the given human name for the personification of the United Kingdom from the anime series Hetalia: Axis Powers
Arthur, a character 1991 American coming-of-age comedy-drama movie My Girl
Arthur Birling, an antagonist within the post-war play An Inspector Calls
Arthur Curry, Aquaman
Arthur the Tank Engine, a character from Thomas and Friends
Ser Arthur Dayne, a character from A Song of Ice and Fire book series
Arthur Denison, the main character of the Dinotopia book series
Arthur Dent, the main character of The Hitchhiker's Guide to the Galaxy series
 Arthur Dupres, a character in the American TV miniseries V (1983 miniseries)
Arthur Fleck, the main character in Joker (2019 film)
Arthur Fonzarelli, Happy Days
Arthur Morgan, the main character of the video game Red Dead Redemption 2
Arthur Read, main character in Arthur (TV Show)
Arthur Seaton is the main character in Alan Sillitoe's debut novel Saturday Night and Sunday Morning.
Arthur Shelby, a character from the Peaky Blinders (TV series)
Arthur Weasley, a character of the Harry Potter book series
Arthur Wright, a character in the 1997 French-American fantasy drama movie FairyTale: A True Story
Arthur Watts, a major antagonist in the animated web series RWBY

In many languages
Albanian: Artur
Amharic: አርተር
Arabic: أرثر, ارثور, ارتور
Armenian:  (Art'ur)
Basque: Artur, Artza
Bengali: আর্থার (Ārthāra)
Breton: Arzhur
Bulgarian: Артур (Artur)
Catalan: Artur, Artús
Chechen: Артур (Artur)
Chinese: Simplified: 亚瑟 (Yàsè), 阿瑟 (Āsè), 阿图尔 (Ātúěr) Traditional: 亞瑟 (Yàsè), 阿瑟 (Āsè), 阿圖爾 (Ātúěr)
Croatian: Artur
Czech: Artuš, Artur
Danish: Arthur
Dutch: Arthur, Artuur
Estonian: Artur, Ats
English: Arthur
Finnish: Artturi, Arttu, Arto, Artto
French: Arthur
Galician: Artur, Artús
Georgian: ართური (Arturi)
German: Artur, Arthur
Greek: Αρθούρος (Arthouros/Artouros)
Gujarati: આર્થર (Ārthara)
Hebrew: ארתור (Artur)
Hindi: आर्थर (aarthar)
Hungarian: Artúr
Icelandic: Arthur
Indonesian: Arthur
Inuktitut: ᐋᑐᕐ (aatur)
Irish: Artúr
Italian: Arturo (common name), Artù (the Briton king)
Japanese: アーサー (Āsā) (in katakana)
Kannada: ಆರ್ಥರ್‌ (Ārthar‌)
Korean: 아서 (Aseo), 아써 (Asseo), 아더 (Adeo)
Kurdish: ئارتەر
Latin: Arturus/Arthurus, Artorius/Arturius
Latvian: Artūrs
Lithuanian: Artūras
Malayalam: ആർതർ (ārtar)
Maldivian: އަރތަރ
Maltese: Arturu, Turu
Nāhuatl: Arthur
Norman: Èrthu
Norwegian: Artur
Ossetian: Артур (Artur)
Patois: Aata
Persian: آرتور
Polish: Artur
Portuguese: Artur, Arthur (archaic spelling, common in Brazil)
Punjabi: Gurmukhi script: ਆਰਥਰ (Ārathara), Shahmukhi script: آرتھر 
Romanian: Arthur, Artur
Russian: Артур (Artur)
Serbian: Артур (Artur)
Sinhalese: ආතර් (ātar)
Slovak: Artúr, Artuš
Slovenian: Artur
Spanish: Arturo
Swedish: Artur
Thai: อาร์เธอร์ (Xār̒ṭhexr̒)
Turkish: Artur
Ukrainian: Артур (Artur)
Urdu: آرتھر
Uzbek: Artur
Welsh: Arthur

See also 
Arturo
MacArthur (disambiguation)
Macarthur (disambiguation)
McArthur (disambiguation)

References

Sources

.
.
. (EBSCO subscription required for online access.)
.
.
.
 
.
. (JSTOR subscription required for online access.)
 Jaski, Bart, Early Irish examples of the name Arthur, Z.C.P. band 56, 2004

Welsh masculine given names
English-language masculine given names
English masculine given names
Irish masculine given names
Scottish masculine given names
French masculine given names
Dutch masculine given names
Norwegian masculine given names
Swedish masculine given names
Finnish masculine given names
Danish masculine given names

vi:Arthur